Wasu Rural LLG is a local-level government (LLG) of Morobe Province, Papua New Guinea.

During World War II, the Battle of Sio took place in the LLG.

Wards
01. Yakawa
02. Sio 2
03. Sio 1
04. Kulavi
05. Wasu Station
06. Kiari
07. Weleki
08. Towat
09. Welowelo
10. Singorokai
11. Roinji (Ronji language speakers)
12. Hungo
13. Satop
14. Wawet
15. Domut
16. Belombibi
17. Karangan
18. Niniea

References

Local-level governments of Morobe Province